Greatest Hits is a compilation album of live and studio tracks by Elkie Brooks.

Compiled in 2000, it was issued on CD in the same year by Brilliant in Germany only.

Track listing
 "Only Women Bleed"
 "Pearl's a Singer"
 "Nights in White Satin"
 "Stairway to Heaven"
 "From The Heart"
 "Foolish Games"
 "May you Never"
 "One Of A Kind"
 "You Are So Beautiful"
 "Sail On"
 "Only Love Can Break Your Heart"
 "Sunshine After The Rain"
 "Fool If You Think"
 "Lilac Wine"

2000 compilation albums
Elkie Brooks albums